Mordant red 19 is an organic compound with the chemical formula C16H13ClN4O5S.  It is classified as an azo dye.

It is a mordant used in textile dyeing, usually in combination with chromium.  It is usually found as the sodium salt.

See also
Alizarin
List of colors

References

External links
Google images of Mordant Red 19

Shades of red
Azo dyes
Pyrazolones
Sulfonic acids
Chloroarenes
Phenols